Johnny Cash at San Quentin is the 31st overall album and second live album by American singer-songwriter Johnny Cash, recorded live at San Quentin State Prison on February 24, 1969, and released on June 16 of that same year. The concert was filmed by Granada Television, produced and directed by Michael Darlow. The album was the second in Cash's conceptual series of live prison albums that also included At Folsom Prison (1968), På Österåker (1973), and A Concert Behind Prison Walls (1976).

The album was certified gold on August 12, 1969, platinum and double platinum on November 21, 1986, and triple platinum on March 27, 2003, by the RIAA. The album was nominated for a number of Grammy Awards, including Album of the Year and won Best Male Country Vocal Performance for "A Boy Named Sue."

There have been several releases with different songs and set order. The album cover photo by Jim Marshall is considered to be an iconic image of Cash, with Marshall Grant's Epiphone Newport bass guitar famously silhouetted in the foreground.

Recording
Johnny Cash had previously recorded a concert at a prison in 1968 at Folsom State Prison. This concert was recorded for a live LP and a television documentary for the UK. On the original LP release, the song order was changed and several songs were cut, presumably for space reasons. Despite the timing limitations of the vinyl LP format, however, both performances of the song "San Quentin" (Cash agreed to perform an encore at the audience's request) are included on the original album. Early CDs that feature this and At Folsom Prison on the same disc, however, contain only the second version due to time constraints. Some of the songs were censored. Despite the title of the version released on CD in 2000 – At San Quentin (The Complete 1969 Concert) – the CD does not contain the entire concert uncut, but does feature additional tracks and running order that parallels the actual setlist. Performed but not included were the songs "Jackson" and "Orange Blossom Special", which are included in the video release of the show (both songs had been included in At Folsom Prison).  Two songs were somehow slowed down by half a step ("Starkville City Jail" and "Blistered"), possibly due to using another tape machine while the tape on the original machine was changed.

This was Cash's first album recorded without his longtime lead guitar player and Tennessee Two founder Luther Perkins, who had died several months earlier. On the album, Cash is heard paying tribute to Perkins (who was not related to Carl Perkins, who appears on the recording as lead guitarist on several tracks).

Two songs are performed live on stage for the first time during the show: "San Quentin" and "A Boy Named Sue". According to biographer Robert Hilburn, the decision had already been made for Cash to perform "San Quentin" twice as it was considered the major new song of the set, though on record Cash makes it appear as if the encore is due to audience demand; producer Bob Johnson ultimately chose to include both versions of the song on the album. According to Hilburn, Cash spontaneously decided to perform "A Boy Named Sue" during the show and neither the TV crew nor his band knew he planned to do it (though he gave them advance warning by announcing early in the show his intent to play it); he used a lyric sheet on stage while the band improvised the backing.

TV special and middle finger photo
A crew from Granada Television in the UK filmed the concert for broadcast on television. In the extended version of the concert released by Columbia/Legacy in 2000, Cash is heard expressing frustration at being told what to sing and where to stand prior to his performance of "I Walk the Line". The famous image of an angry-looking Cash giving the middle finger gesture to a camera originates from the performance; in his liner notes for the 2000 reissue, Cash explains that he was frustrated at having Granada's film crew blocking his view of the audience. When the crew ignored his request to "clear the stage", he made the gesture.

Reception

Reviewing for The Village Voice in 1969, Robert Christgau said of the album, "Much inferior to Folsom Prison and Greatest Hits, which is where to start if you're just getting into Cash. Contains only nine songs, one of which is performed twice. Another was written by Bob Dylan." Rolling Stone magazine's Phil Marsh wrote, "Cash sounds very tired on this record ('ol' Johnny does best under pressure,' he says), his voice on some songs just straying off pitch. But the feeling that actual human communication is taking place more than compensates for this. Communicating to an audience at the time is becoming a lost art because of the ascension of recorded music as the music of this culture."

The album was nominated for a number of Grammy Awards, including Album of the Year and won Best Male Country Vocal Performance for "A Boy Named Sue".

Reviewing the 2000 Columbia/Legacy reissue, Blender magazine's Phil Sutcliffe said, "Cash, just 25 , sings as old as the hills — and looks oddly Volcanic. Prisoners 'have their hearts torn out,' Cash reckoned. It sounds as if he did too, wild-eyed and shuddering at the oppression of the walls. The crowd is a 1,000-strong caged animal. The reissue, with nine extra tracks, surpasses the vinyl original."

Track listing

Original release

2000 CD reissue

Notes

Has no author-credit. Apparently David G. George did not win a lawsuit against RCA-Victor in 1933 over the copyrights for this song.

It is worth noting, however, that it seems to be widely accepted that Henry Whitter wrote the music, as "The Ship That Never Returned"; Fred Lewey wrote the original words, and Charles Noell wrote the original two additional verses.

2006 Legacy edition

Disc three (DVD)

The original 1969 documentary produced by Granada TV in the U.K. chronicles Cash's historic concert at the maximum security prison. Includes footage of the concert that became the 1969 best-selling LP, and features an edited performance of the number 1 hit "A Boy Named Sue". Also contains one-on-one interviews with several of the prison guards and inmates, talking about their time and experiences behind bars. (Running time: approx. 60 minutes)

Several tracks on the original LP are preceded by several minutes of Cash talking to the audience, including a tangent where Cash is recorded trying to get his guitar tuned on stage. The original LP release bleeps profanity, including on "A Boy Named Sue" but later issues including the Legacy edition are uncensored. The original album's closing track "Folsom Prison Blues" is a partial performance of the song edited from a longer medley available in complete form in later reissues.

Personnel
Johnny Cash – vocals, rhythm guitar, harmonica
June Carter Cash – vocals
Carter Family – vocals, autoharp, acoustic guitar
Marshall Grant – bass guitar
W.S. Holland – drums
Carl Perkins – rhythm guitar, lead guitar, vocals
Bob Wootton – lead guitar
The Statler Brothers – vocals

Charts
Album – Billboard (United States)

Certifications and sales

References

External links

 At San Quentin (2000 CD release) (Adobe Flash) at Radio3Net (streamed copy where licensed)
 Sony/Columbia/Legacy Johnny Cash At San Quentin liner notes legacyrecordings.com.
 At San Quentin – Legacy Edition
 Daniel Geary, "'The Way I Would Feel About San Quentin': Johnny Cash and the Politics of Country Music," Daedalus, 142 (Fall 2013), 64-72.  http://www.mitpressjournals.org/doi/abs/10.1162/DAED_a_00234

1969 live albums
2008 video albums
Albums produced by Bob Johnston
Johnny Cash live albums
Columbia Records live albums
Columbia Records video albums
Live video albums
Prison music
San Quentin State Prison